The Bacone is an American breakfast dish consisting of bacon shaped into a cone, filled with scrambled eggs, hash browns, and cheese and topped with a layer of sausage gravy and a biscuit. Inventors Christian Williams and Melissa Tillman debuted the Bacone at Bacon Camp 2009 in San Francisco, CA where it won the Judge's Choice award. Following its appearance at Bacon Camp, it garnered local and national media attention, including a mention in Gourmet Magazine, and a special segment on the Food Network channel, in the show What Would Brian Boitano Make?, where Williams showed Boitano how to make one.

See also
List of bacon dishes

References

External links
The Bacone on What Would Brian Boitano Make?

Bacon dishes